Elvijs Biezais (born June 30, 1991, in Riga, Soviet Union) is a Latvian ice hockey forward, currently playing for Dinamo Riga of Kontinental Hockey League. He played for several Latvian league youth teams before joining HK Riga.

On September 6, 2012, he made his debut in loss against HC Lev Praha.

References

1991 births
Living people
Ice hockey people from Riga
Latvian ice hockey forwards
HK Riga players
Dinamo Riga players